The 1977 France rugby union tour of Argentina was a series of matches played between June and July 1977 in Argentina France national rugby union team

Two test matches was played with a victory for France and a draw.

Match details

References

1977 rugby union tours
1976–77 in French rugby union
1977
1977
1977 in Argentine rugby union